Gibbovalva civica is a moth of the family Gracillariidae. It is known from China (Guangdong), India (Karnataka), Japan (Shikoku, Honshū, Tusima, the Ryukyu Islands and Kyūshū), Malaysia (West Malaysia).

The wingspan is 6.8-8.5 mm.

The larvae feed on Cinnamomum camphora, Cinnamomum daphnoides, Cinnamomum japonicum, Cinnamomum sieboldii, Cinnamomum verum, Cinnamomum zeylanicum, Neolitsea sericea and Persea thunbergii. They probably mine the leaves of their host plant.

References

Acrocercopinae
Moths of Asia
Moths of Japan
Moths described in 1914